List of celebrity boxing matches, most of which were for charity or some type of Exhibition Fight.

Matches

Professional matches 

Here is a list of fights undertaken by celebrities and sanctioned as professional boxing matches.

See also 
Celebrity Boxing, 2002 reality TV show
Influencer Boxing Matches
White-Collar Boxing
YouTube Boxers
YouTube Boxing Events

References

Celebrity
Boxing-related lists
Boxing
Boxing
Crossover boxing events